Bruce Wayne Smith (born September 6, 1961) is an American animator, character designer, film director and television producer. He is best known as the creator of Disney Channel's The Proud Family and The Proud Family: Louder and Prouder, as well as the supervising animator of Kerchak and Baboons & Baby Baboon in Tarzan, Pacha in The Emperor's New Groove, Dr. Facilier in The Princess and the Frog and Piglet, Kanga and Roo in Winnie the Pooh.

Biography
Smith grew up in Los Angeles, California. At age 10, he made his first animated film based on designs of One Hundred and One Dalmatians.

Smith studied animation in the Character Animation program at the California Institute of the Arts. He later stated that while at CalArts he became aware of the lack of Black characters in animated films which motivated him to create his own animated series. In 1984, he was the key assistant animator on a TV short of Garfield in the Rough. In the years that followed he would be a writer on episodes of the TV series ThunderCats. In 1987, he would be an animator for Pinocchio and the Emperor of the Night.

He joined the Walt Disney Studios as an animator on Who Framed Roger Rabbit
He also worked on various other Roger Rabbit shorts that the studio produced. In 2022, Smith said that the "big old tree Afro" with lips is a caricature of himself that he drew while working on the show.

He would also be an animator for the Back to Neverland short, Michael & Mickey, and Rock-A-Doodle. Additionally, he would work on Rover Dangerfield as a storyboarder, character designer, character animator, and sequence director. In 1997, Smith was a scenic artist for the film, The Peacemaker and was an animator for The Indescribable Nth and Garfield in the Rough. He also worked as a character designer for C-Bear and Jamal.

Some years later, Smith was handpicked by producer/director Reginald Hudlin (House Party, Boomerang) to direct the Paramount Pictures animated film Bébé's Kids. In years that followed, he would be a character designer for the A Cool Like That Christmas. and A Goofy Movie television movies, supervising animator of The Pagemaster He would also work on the Happily Ever After: Fairy Tales for Every Child TV Series in various roles.

Smith also served as co-director on the Warner Bros. live action/animated film Space Jam 
 before returning to Disney as supervising animator on such films as Tarzan (Kerchak and Baboons) and The Emperor's New Groove (Pacha).

Later works
While working animation on the feature film side, Smith started feeding into his love of television animation and created The Proud Family for  Disney Channel. He co-founded Jambalaya Studios, with Hyperion Pictures for the production of the series and crafted over 50 episodes of the series along with The Proud Family Movie. The name of the series, the first venture for Jambalaya Studio, came from something he told his co-founder, Tom Wilhite when he showed him the show's main characters drawn as though they were in a family portrait.

In 2004, he would be the supervising animator for Home on the Range, The same year, he be the executive producer and co-creator of the series Da Boom Crew. Smith later described the series as mixing concepts of Star Wars and Boyz-N-The Hood, and argued that the series tries to recreate the "black experience in animated form."

In 2009, Smith rejoined the Walt Disney Studios and Duncan Studio Production to supervise animation on The Princess and the Frog (Dr. Facilier), the 2011 Winnie the Pooh movie (Piglet, Kanga and Roo), and as the lead animator on the short Tangled Ever After. Smith's knack for unique character design led him into the visual development of other projects at the studio such as Wreck-It Ralph and Frozen.

In 2015, he would be part of the senior creative team of Tinker Bell and the Legend of the NeverBeast in 2015. In 2018, he would be an animator for Teen Titans Go! To the Movies In 2019, he directed the Academy Award for Best Animated Short Film winner Hair Love.

He returned to The Proud Family with The Proud Family: Louder and Prouder, which began airing on Disney+ starting on February 28, 2022. This was spurred by the fact that on January 1, 2020, the original The Proud Family series began streaming on Disney+, and shortly thereafter Disney executives approached Smith and Ralph Farquhar about reviving the series On February 27, 2020, the show was formally ordered on Disney+. Smith concurred with Farquhar, saying that the "show never really went away" and called it the "perfect time to bring back this show." Smith also argued that the series is "blazing a path...[in] this animated sphere," saying it has parts of the horror, sci-fi, and Western genres. The show is rated TV-PG making this the first Disney animated series to carry this rating.

In December 2020, he signed an overall deal with Disney with Farquhar.

On April 18, 2022, Disney+ renewed The Proud Family: Louder and Prouder for a second season.

Smith is an animator and member of the production time for an upcoming hand-drawn indie animated steampunk film entitled Hullabaloo''.

Filmography

Internet

References

External links
 
 

1961 births
Living people
African-American artists
African-American film directors
African-American television directors
Animators from California
American film producers
Television producers from California
American television directors
American television writers
American male television writers
Artists from Los Angeles
California Institute of the Arts alumni
Walt Disney Animation Studios people
Filmation people
American storyboard artists
American animated film directors
Film directors from Los Angeles
Screenwriters from California
Showrunners
Directors of Best Animated Short Academy Award winners